Hugh de Stirling (Hugo or Hugo de Strivelin) was a 13th-century bishop-elect of Dunkeld. He appears to have been a canon of the diocese. His locational epithet, de Strivelin, "of Stirling", indicates some association with the burgh or sheriffdom of Stirling, either as a place of origin or as a place at which he practised as a priest. He was elected to the diocese of Dunkeld in 1283 after the death of Robert de Stuteville. However, Hugo died at the papal court in Rome whilst pursuing his consecration.

References

Sources
Dowden, John, The Bishops of Scotland, ed. J. Maitland Thomson, (Glasgow, 1912)

1283 deaths
Bishops of Dunkeld (non consecrated, titular or doubtful)
People from Stirling
Year of birth unknown
13th-century Scottish Roman Catholic bishops